Erik Gustav Benjaminsen (born September 3, 1992) is a US-born Norwegian footballer who plays for Lommedalen in the 3. divisjon.

With an American mother and a Norwegian father, Benjaminsen has represented both Norway and the United States at youth international level.

Career

Club
Benjaminsen has a Norwegian father and an American mother and was born in San Francisco. He lived in Fresno, California for six years before his family moved to Norway. As a young boy, Benjaminsen joined Hauger FK, but at the age of fifteen he moved to Stabæk. He worked his way through the youth system, playing for the U-19 team and the reserve team.

Benjaminsen made his debut for the senior team in the first round of the 2010 Norwegian Cup, coming on as a substitute in a 12-1 demolition of Høland IL. Benjaminsen signed a professional contract in August 2010, making him eligible for league play.

On 12 May 2012, Benjaminsen made his debut in Tippeligaen in Stabæk's 5–0 loss against Molde, when he replaced Vegar Eggen Hedenstad as a substitute after 16 minutes.

International
Like his teammate Mix Diskerud, Benjaminsen is a dual national holding both Norwegian and American citizenship. Also like Diskerud, Benjaminsen has played for Norwegian youth teams in informal competitions. However, in 2009 Benjaminsen said that, "I am 100% American. I always have been. My goal is to make the US national team. It has always been my dream. If I were to get a call [from US Under-20 team coach Thomas Rongen], I would take it in a heartbeat."

In May 2010, Benjaminsen accepted a callup to the US U-20 team to compete in a youth tournament in the Netherlands.

Future callups were not forthcoming from the US U-20 camp and in September 2010, Benjaminsen accepted a callup to the Norwegian under-19 team. He made his official debut for the team on September 29 in a 2–0 loss to Estonia U-19 in a qualifier for the 2011 UEFA European Under-19 Football Championship.

Career statistics

References

1992 births
Living people
Soccer players from San Francisco
American soccer players
American emigrants to Norway
American people of Norwegian descent
Sportspeople from Bærum
Norwegian footballers
Stabæk Fotball players
Eliteserien players
United States men's youth international soccer players
Norway youth international footballers
Association football midfielders